The 2022 Arkansas Razorbacks football team  represented the University of Arkansas in the 2022 NCAA Division I FBS football season. The Razorbacks played their home games at Donald W. Reynolds Razorback Stadium in Fayetteville, Arkansas, and competed in the Western Division of the Southeastern Conference (SEC). They were led by third-year head coach Sam Pittman. Arkansas won a bowl game in back-to-back seasons for only the second time in program history, repeating the feat of the 2014 and 2015 seasons.

Previous season
The Razorbacks finished the 2021 season 8–4, 4–4 in SEC play to finish tied for third place in the West Division. Arkansas was invited to play in the 2022 Outback Bowl on New Year's Day against Penn State, and defeated the Nittany Lions 24–10 to finish 9-4 overall. Former All-SEC wide receiver Treylon Burks was drafted in the first round of the 2022 NFL Draft by the Tennessee Titans, while former defensive tackle John Ridgeway III was drafted by the Dallas Cowboys in the fifth round before joining the Washington Commanders.

Recruits
The Razorbacks signed a total of 20 recruits on the first day of the early signing period, December 15, 2021, all from high school for the 2022 Class. Arkansas also signed one junior college player in May 2022.

Arkansas has also signed nine transfers from the transfer portal for the 2022 Class. According to 247Sports, Arkansas has the #11 portal transfer class in the nation.

Schedule
Arkansas and the SEC announced the 2022 football schedule on September 21, 2021.

Game summaries

No. 23 Cincinnati

South Carolina

No. 5 (FCS) Missouri State

vs. No. 23 Texas A&M

No. 2 Alabama

at No. 23 Mississippi State

at BYU

at Auburn

Liberty

No. 7 LSU

No. 14 Ole Miss

at Missouri

Liberty Bowl – vs. Kansas

Statistics

Team

Scores by quarter

Coaching staff

Rankings

References

Arkansas
Arkansas Razorbacks football seasons
Liberty Bowl champion seasons
Arkansas Razorbacks football